The Jefferson County Courier was a weekly newspaper covering Jefferson County, Montana.

The Jefferson County Courier was established by Jan Anderson in 1997. Anderson subsequently bought The Boulder Monitor in 2002 and, in 2011, merged the two newspapers under the name The Boulder Monitor.

In 2001 The Jefferson County Courier was recognized as the best weekly newspaper in Montana by the Montana Newspaper Association and, in 2004, it received that year's National Newspaper Association Freedom of Information Award.

References

2011 disestablishments in Montana
Weekly newspapers published in the United States